Dədəli may refer to:

Dədəli, Agsu, Azerbaijan
Dədəli, Fizuli, Azerbaijan
Dədəli, Khachmaz, Azerbaijan